Bohuslav Ceplecha (6 May 1977 – 14 July 2012)  was a rally co-driver. He died on 14 July 2012 after a serious accident at Rally Bohemia in the Czech Republic.

Death
He died in a crash in the third stage when driver Martin Semerád lost control of his Lancer and a hit a tree at high speed. Rescue units reached the scene but despite the efforts, Ceplecha's injuries were too severe and he succumbed on the spot. The 22-year-old Semerád, who was taken to a hospital by a helicopter, survived with a minor injury suffering with a clavicle fracture. The 39th edition of the rally was cancelled after the accident.

References 

1977 births
2012 deaths
Czech rally co-drivers
Racing drivers who died while racing
Sport deaths in the Czech Republic
World Rally Championship co-drivers